Manidvipa is the celestial abode of Adi Shakti, the supreme goddess, according to the Shaktism tradition in Hinduism. It is an island situated in the middle of an ocean called the Sudha Samudra (the ocean of nectar). In the Devi Bhagavata Purana, Manidvipa is portrayed as the Sarvaloka, the highest world, superior to Goloka, the realm of Krishna, Vaikuntha, the realm of Vishnu and Lakshmi, Kailasa, the realm of Shiva and Parvati, and Brahmaloka, the realm of Brahma and Saraswati. This is consistent with the scripture's portrayal of goddess Bhuvaneshvari being greater than any of the Trimurti. In her forms as Bhuvaneshvari and Tripura Sundari, Devi is the ruler of Manidvipa. This goddess is believed to have created this island according to her will.

Description 

The descriptions of Manidvipa can be found in the Devi Bhagavata Purana, Mahabhagavata Purana, and Tripura Rahasya.

According to the goddess-centric tradition, during the beginning of time, the Trimurti – Brahma, Vishnu, and Rudra - did not know who they were, and what their purpose was. At this time, a flying chariot appeared before them, and a heavenly voice directed them to board the chariot. As the Trimurti boarded the chariot, it started flowing with mind's speed and took them to a mysterious place, which was an island of gems surrounded by an ocean of nectar and pristine sylvan forests. As they stepped out of the chariot, the Trimurti were transformed into women, much to their astonishment. As they explored the island, they came across an imposing city protected by nine enclosures and guarded by fierce Bhairavas, Matrikas, Kshetrapalas, and Dikpalas. As they entered the city, they were amazed by its prosperity and soaring infrastructure and finally reached the imperial palace, known as Chintamani griha, guarded by yoginis. This city is called Śrīpūra (Devipattana), the capital of Bhuvaneshvari, the ruler of Manidvipa, the abode of Adi Parashakti. When they entered the palace, they observed Bhuvaneshvari, who is described to be the queen of all the worlds. Brahma describes her sitting on her throne in the Devi Bhagavata Purana:

She was seated on the left lap of Bhuvaneshvara Mahadeva, who was of white complexion, wore white garments, and was decked with ornaments. His hair was matted and was decorated by a crescent moon and Ganga. He had five faces each with three-eyes, and four arms, holding a trident and a battle-ax while displaying varada and abhaya mudras. Before creation, while intending to the sport, the Devi Bhagavati divided Her Body into two parts and from the right part created Bhuvaneshvara. The divine couple was seated on Panchapretasana, a throne which had Paramashiva as plank while Sadashiva, Ishvara, Rudra, Vishnu and Brahma were five legs. They were being served by many Yoginis, some fanning them, some holding mirror, some offering betel leaves flavored with camphor, some offering a drink made by mixing honey, ghee, and coconut water. Some were ready to dress Bhuvaneshvari's hair, some ready to do makeup, some busy stringing garlands while some singing and dancing to entertain Devi.

The Devi Bhagavata Purana also describes the attendants of the goddess who serve her on the island:

In The Tripura Rahasya's Jnana Khanda, the goddess Tripura Sundari says that the abode of her material form is Manidvipa:

References 

God in Hinduism
Locations in Hindu mythology
Shaktism